Stephen Waarts (born 1996) is a Dutch American violinist. He was the first prize winner in the senior division of the 2014 Yehudi Menuhin International Competition for Young Violinists in Austin, Texas. He was also the fifth prize winner of the 2015 Queen Elisabeth Competition in Brussels, Belgium.

Life and career 
Born in America, with a twin brother and younger sister, Waarts began his violin studies at age 5 and piano studies at age 8, with Krishnabai Lewis and Jenny Rudin, starting with Suzuki violin lessons. At 14, Waarts simultaneously graduated high school and the San Francisco Conservatory Preparatory Division studying with Li Lin and was accepted at the Curtis Institute of Music in Philadelphia, Pennsylvania where he was a student under Aarond Rosand since 2010. Waarts was also a student of Itzhak Perlman at the Perlman Music Program and currently studies at Kronberg Academy as a student of Mihaela Martin. He also studied piano with Annie Petit, while pursuing his Bachelor of Music degree.

Waarts has performed at venues like Weimar Hall in Germany, Moscow State University, Teatro Gayarre in Spain, Oslo Conservatory, Carnegie Hall, Herbst Theater in San Francisco, Ford Amphitheater in Los Angeles, and Field Concert Hall in Philadelphia. He has also performed with San Francisco Chamber Orchestra, Cleveland Orchestra, Austin Symphony, Berlin Konzerthaus Orchester, Szczecin Philharmonic, hr-Sinfonieorchester, Munich Philharmonic, Kansas City Symphony, Israel Philharmonic Orchestra, BBC Scottish Symphony Orchestra, and Lucerne Symphony Orchestra He also released an album in 2018 with pianist Gabriele Carcano featuring works by Schumann and Bartók and released another one in 2020 called Hindemith Kammermusik nr. 4, after Kammermusik No. 4.

Waarts has played on violins such as an 1868 Jean-Baptiste Vuillaume and a c.1750 Pietro Guarneri of Venice violin, on loan through the Stradivari Society with bows made by Dominique Peccatte.

Awards and appearances 
 2010: Second prize, junior division, Yehudi Menuhin International Competition for Young Violinists 
 2010: First prize, Junior division, International Louis Spohr Competition for Young Violinists
 2010: Prize winner, Khuner Young Artists Concerto Competition 
 2011: Prize winner, Sarasate Competition 
 2013: Second prize, Montreal International Competition
 2013: Audience prize, Montreal International Competition
 2014: First prize, senior division, Yehudi Menuhin International Competition for Young Violinists
 2015: Fifth prize, Queen Elisabeth Competition
 2017: Recipient, Avery Fisher Career Grant
 2019: Orchestra Award, International Classical Music Awards
 2020: Carnegie Hall Debut at Zankel Hall

References 

1996 births
American violinists
Dutch violinists
Living people
Male violinists